The Dorchester Kingston Park Tournament  a late Victorian era grass court tennis tournament staged first staged in August 1879. The tournament was organised by the Kingston Park Cricket and Lawn Tennis Club, and held on the cricket grounds, Kingston Park, Kingston Maurward House, Dorchester, Dorset, England. The tournament was held to at least 1885.

History

(Kingston Maurward House and gounds, in 2008 the location of this tournament)

In August 1879 the Kingston Park Cricket and Lawn Tennis Club held a lawn tennis tournament on the cricket grounds of Kingston Park, Kingston Maurward House, Dorchester, Dorset, England. The club continued to hold a number of annual tournaments in the spring, summer, and autumn, through till 1885. The inugural gentleman's singles was won by Montague Hankey, who competed at the 1877 and 1880 Wimbledon Championships. 

Although this tournament was abolished the Kingston Park Lawn Tennis Club reestablished a new tennis event during the 1920s called the Kingston Park Invitation Open Tennis Tournament. In 1928 Prince George of Greece and Denmark played in the tournament that year. It was still being held till the mid 1930's. 

In 1937 Kingston Park Lawn Tennis Club hosted the Dorset County Tennis Championships.

References

Sources
 Bridport News. (22 August 1879) Bridport, Dorest, England: British Newspaper Archives.   
 National Sports. (1879) The Illustrated London News. London:   
 Nieuwland, Alex. "Tournament – Dorchester". www.tennisarchives.com. Tennis Archives. 
 Player Profile: Montague Hankey. www.wimbledon.com. AELTC.   
 Poole Telegram. (24 August 1885) Poole, Dorset, England: British Newspaper Archives.    
 Southern Times and Dorset County Herald. (26 June 1880) Weymouth, Dorset, England: British Newspaper Archives.    
 Southern Times and Dorset County Herald. (17 September 1881) Weymouth, Dorset, England: British Newspaper Archives.   
 Western Gazette. (2 August 1928) Yeovil, Somerset, England.: British Newspaper Archives.    
 Western Gazette. (9 August 1935) Yeovil, Somerset, England.: British Newspaper Archives.    
 Western Gazette. (6 August 1937) Yeovil, Somerset, England.: British Newspaper Archives.

Grass court tennis tournaments
Defunct tennis tournaments in the United Kingdom
Tennis tournaments in England